The 2007 Arizona Wildcats football team represented the University of Arizona during the 2007 NCAA Division I FBS football season.

Schedule

Game summaries

Oregon

Source:

Awards
K Jason Bondzio
All-Pacific-10 (Honorable Mention)

OT Eben Britton
All-Pacific-10 (2nd team)

CB Antoine Cason
All-American (consensus 1st team: Walter Camp, AP, TSN, CBS Sports, ESPN.com, Rivals.com, SI.com, CollegeFootballNews)
All-Pacific-10 (1st team)
Jim Thorpe Award 
Chuck Bednarik Award semifinalist
Ronnie Lott Award semifinalist

P Keenyn Crier
All-Pacific-10 (1st team)

DT Lionel Dotson
All-Pacific-10 (2nd team)

OT Peter Graniello
All-Pacific-10 (Honorable Mention)

TE Rob Gronkowski
All-Pacific-10 (Honorable Mention)

LB Spencer Larsen
All-Pacific-10 (1st team)

WR Mike Thomas
All-Pacific-10 (1st team)

QB Willie Tuitama
All-Pacific-10 (Honorable Mention)

References

Arizona
Arizona Wildcats football seasons
Arizona Wildcats football